Pontypool Clarence Street railway station was a station on the former Taff Vale Extension (TVE) of the Newport, Abergavenny and Hereford Railway. The TVE was opened in 1857 to link up with the Taff Vale Railway (TVR) at Quakers Yard which connected onto Merthyr Tydfil. A major achievement of this railway was the building of the Crumlin Viaduct over the Ebbw River. The TVE linked directly with the Vale of Neath Railway at Merthyr and further linked Pontypool to Swansea and Neath. The main purpose of this line was the transport of coal across the country.

The TVE line opened 20 August 1855.

The goods station closed in 1901. The goods shed is now part of Robert Price's yard.

Passenger services on the TVE ceased on 15 June 1964 though coal traffic continued. The site of Clarence Street station is now the A472 dual carriageway road.

References

Disused railway stations in Torfaen
Former Great Western Railway stations
Railway stations in Great Britain opened in 1855
Railway stations in Great Britain closed in 1964
Pontypool